Belleville High School may refer to:

Belleville High School (Belleville, Kansas), Belleville, Kansas
Belleville High School (Belleville, Michigan), Belleville, Michigan
Belleville High School (New Jersey), Belleville, New Jersey
Belleville High School (Belleville, Wisconsin), Belleville, Wisconsin
Belleville High School-East, Belleville, Illinois
Belleville High School-West, Belleville, Illinois